The R817 road is a suburban road in south Dublin, Ireland connecting Harold's Cross to Ballyboden via Kimmage, Templeogue, and Ballyroan.

The official definition of the R817 from the Roads Act, 1993 (Classification of Regional Roads) Order, 2012  states:

 R817: Harold's Cross - Ballyboden, County Dublin

Between its junction with R137 at Harolds Cross Road in the city of Dublin and its junction with R115 at Ballyboden Road in the county of South Dublin via Harolds Cross Road, Kimmage Road Lower and Fortfield Road in the city of Dublin: Wainsfort Road, Cypress Grove Road, Old Bridge Road and Ballyroan Road in the county of South Dublin.

See also
Roads in Ireland
Regional road

References

Regional roads in the Republic of Ireland
Roads in County Dublin
Templeogue